Montabaur is a town and the district seat of the Westerwaldkreis in Rhineland-Palatinate, Germany. At the same time, it is also the administrative centre of the Verbandsgemeinde of Montabaur – a kind of collective municipality – to which 24 other communities belong. The town is known throughout the country for its strikingly yellow castle and its InterCityExpress railway station on the Cologne-Frankfurt high-speed rail line.

Geography

Location 
Montabaur lies in the Westerwald, roughly 20 km northeast of Koblenz. About 14,000 people live in the city, while the district is home to about 40,000.

Constituent communities 
Montabaur has seven outlying centres. In the north lies Eschelbach, and in the west lie Horressen and Elgendorf. Stretching south along the Gelbach valley are the pilgrimage centre of Wirzenborn, and, farther along still, Reckenthal, Bladernheim and Ettersdorf.

Neighbouring communities 
Montabaur's neighbours are, clockwise beginning in the north, Dernbach, Staudt, Heiligenroth, Großholbach, Girod, Steinefrenz, Heilberscheid, Isselbach, Stahlhofen, Untershausen, Holler, Niederelbert, Arzbach, Kadenbach, Neuhäusel, Nomborn and Hillscheid.

Town’s character 
Montabaur's Old Town (Altstadt) is famed for its Gothic Revival Roter Löwe (“Red Lion”) town hall, many timber-frame houses from the 16th and 17th centuries and the great Late Gothic Catholic parish church. The mediaeval town wall is preserved in parts, including the Wolfsturm (“Wolf’s Tower”).

The Montabaur Stadthalle (literally “town hall”, but actually an event venue) is intended for various functions such as conferences, concerts, theatre and other events. The historic Wolfsturm is at the townsfolk's disposal and can be hired for use.

Castle 
Schloss Montabaur was the seat of the district administrator's office of the old Unterwesterwaldkreis until 1945 before becoming the seat of the Montabaur district government. Today, it is owned by the Akademie Deutscher Genossenschaften (“Academy of German Co-operatives”), which has expanded it for use as a 4-star conference hotel and training centre for the Raiffeisenbank and credit unions. It stands in a prominent position above the town on the Schlossberg at 321 m above sea level.

History 

The town has a history that can be traced back to the year 959, with the Montabaur fort castellum Humbacense. The Archbishop-Elector of Trier, Dietrich von Wied, who came back from a Crusade in the Holy Land about 1217, had the humbacense castle newly built and named it Mons Tabor for its similarity to Mount Tabor in Israel, said to be the place of the Transfiguration of Jesus. Out of this grew Montabaur. In 1291, King Rudolf von Habsburg (1218–1291) granted Montabaur, as well as Welschbillig, Mayen, Bernkastel and Saarburg, town rights, so that the village became a town with its own coat of arms and a town wall.

In 1802 with the dissolution of the Archbishopric-Electorate of Trier the princes of Nassau took power in Montabaur and annexed it to the Duchy of Nassau in 1806. With Prussia annexing Nassau in 1866 Montabaur became part of the Wiesbaden Region within the Province of Hesse-Nassau. In 1945 the western Allies partitioned the northwestern part of the Wiesbaden Region with Montabaur and annexed it to the new German state of Rhineland-Palatinate. The partitioned part of the Wiesbaden Region then formed the Montabaur Region (as of 1946) seated in Montabaur. In 1968 the Montabaur Region, one of the originally five Regierungsbezirke of Rhineland-Palatinate, was dissolved and its territory annexed to the adjacent Koblenz Region.

Until early 2004, Montabaur was furthermore a Bundeswehr station with the Westerwaldkaserne, where the Raketenartilleriebataillon 350 (RakArtBtl 350) and, later, maintenance units were stationed.

Politics 

The town council is composed as follows:
 CDU – 15 seats
 SPD – 5 seats
 FWG – 3 seats
 BfM Bürger für Montabaur – 3 seats
 Wählergruppe Hatzmann – 2 seats

Economy
United Internet is headquartered in Montabaur.

 Volkmann & Rossbach Verkehrssicherheitssysteme (transport safety systems)
 Deco Glas
 Ursa Chemie
 Klöckner Pentaplast
 in planning: printing centre for the Mittelrhein-Verlag/Rhein-Zeitung
 Metallwerk Elisenhütte, maker of small-calibre ammunition

Transport 
 A 3 (Cologne–Frankfurt)
 Bundesstraße 49
 Bundesstraße 255
 InterCityExpress railway station at Montabaur on the Cologne-Frankfurt high-speed rail line, Himmelbergtunnel
 Regional railway, Limburg–Siershahn (Unterwesterwaldbahn)
 Recreational airfield for gliders

Culture and sightseeing

Buildings 
 

 Schloss Montabaur
 Wolfsturm (Old Town Wall)
 Parts of the Old Town Wall
 Neo-Gothic Town Hall, built between 1866 and 1868
 many well preserved timber-frame houses, among them one formerly occupied by the Baron of Stein
 Historic Werbhaus

Churches 

 St. Peter in Ketten
The earliest forerunner of the building nowadays used as a Catholic parish church was a wooden church built in 940. In 959 followed another church building on this spot, this time with a stone foundation. Today’s church was built between the 12th and 14th centuries. The oldest parts of the building display Romanesque style elements, although the church’s overall character is Early Gothic. Peculiarities in the décor are a Doomsday painting above the quire arch and a stone Madonna, both remnants of the original décor, as well as a wooden Madonna from about 1450. The parish church has been lavishly renovated and now shines with a new radiance.
 Brüderkirche (Catholic), “Brethren’s Church”, House of God used by the order known as the Barmherzige Brüder Montabaur (“Montabaur Merciful Brethren”)
 Pauluskirche (Evangelical)
 Lutherkirche (Evangelical)
 Anna- or Fuhrmannskapelle
The churchyard’s former funerary chapel was built in 1300 and given timber-frame work on the sides and top in the 17th and 18th centuries, which housed the parish vicars’ dwellings. Today it is part of the house façade southeast of the parish church.
 Marien-Wallfahrtskirche (pilgrimage church) in the outlying centre of Wirzenborn in the Gelbach valley.

Cultural institutions 
 Amateur theatre “Die Oase”
 Stadtbücherei (town library)
 Haus der Jugend (“House of Youth”)
 Katholische öffentliche Bücherei (Catholic public library)
 Stadtarchiv (town archive)
 Stadthalle Haus Mons-Tabor (event venue)
 Akademie für Darstellende Kunst Schauspielwerkstatt e.V. (“Academy for Representative Art” Exhibition Workshop)
 Akademietheater Rheinland-Pfalz
 DPSG scout group “St. Peter in Ketten”
 Kino “Capitol” (cinema)
 Kulturwerkraum

Leisure 
 Mons-Tabor-Bad (swimming pool)
 Trimm-Dich-Pfad (fitness path)
 Nordic-Walking-Park
 The routes are certified by the Deutscher Nordic Walking Nordic Inline Verband (DNV) and range from the shortest route, the 2.36-km fitness path to the longest, the 11.16-km Biebrichskopf-Route. Integrated into the Montabaur Nordic-Walking-Park, too, is the 10-km-long Münz-Sylvesterlauf jogging path.
 Cycling paths run from Montabaur though the Gelbach valley to the Lahn valley.

Ais organizations 
 Montabaur fire brigade
 Technisches Hilfswerk
 German Red Cross
 Deutsche Lebens-Rettungs-Gesellschaft (lifesaving)

Sport clubs 
 American football
 1. AFC Fighting Farmers Montabaur 1992 e.V.
 Angling club
 ASV Montabaur e.V.
 Athletics
 TuS Montabaur
 Badminton
 BC Montabaur Staudt
 Basketball
 BBC Montabaur e.V.
 Boxing
 BCM Boxclub Montabaur e.V
 Cycling
 RSG Montabaur
 Diving
 Tauchsportgruppe Montabaur (TSG)
 Football
 1. FFC Montabaur/Ww. (girls’ and women's football)
 TuS Montabaur
 SV Horressen/Elgendorf
 Hiking
 Schusterjungen Volkssportclub Montabaur
 Judo
 Sportfreunde Montabaur e.V.
 Riding
 Reitverein Montabaur 1965 e.V.
 Shooting
 Schützengesellschaft "St. Sebastianus" 1588 / 1957 e.V. Montabaur (shooting-society-Montabaur)
 Skiing
 Skiclub Montabaur-Horressen
 Swimming
 DLRG Montabaur
 TuS Montabaur
 Tennis
 TC Schwarz-Weiss Montabaur
 TC Mittelwald Montabaur-Horressen
 Triathlon
 RSG Montabaur
 Volleyball, Beachsport
 Beach-Club Dernbach/Montabaur 1995 e.V.

Events 
 Schustermarkt (shoemakers’ market)
 Schützenfest ("shooting club's festival") every year in July.
 Jazzwochenende Montabaur (“Jazz Weekend”)
 Kneipenfestival (“Pub Festival”)
 MonsTaRock
 Mach1 Festival
 Aktivtage
 Kirmes

Education

Schools 
 Joseph-Kehrein-Schule
Big municipal primary school of Montabaur (in 2006, 370 pupils, 16 classes) with a preschool kindergarten class, voluntary all-day school Monday-Thursday until 16:00 including lunch, homework supervision, supervised free time and many further educational offerings. Integrated foreign-language work in English and French. Partner school: École Louis Pasteur in Tonnerre, Burgundy.
 Waldschule (primary school and Hauptschule) in outlying centre of Horressen
 Rhineland-Palatinate state musical Gymnasium
The Peter-Altmeier-Gymnasium Montabaur was until 1999 an Aufbaugymnasium (a Gymnasium for former Realschule students who want to upgrade their secondary education with an Abitur). As of 1991, the first music students came into the fifth class; these first music students did their  Abitur in 2000.
 : Gymnasium with bilingual and natural-sciences section
 Anne-Frank-Realschule
 Heinrich-Roth Duale Oberschule (secondary school)
 Berufsbildende Schule Montabaur (vocational education)
 Akademie für Darstellende Kunst e.V (“Academy for Representative Art”)

Adult education 
 Berufsfortbildungswerk (institution connected with the German Confederation of Trade Unions)
 Bildungswerk Sport – Westerwald branch (sport training)
 Info-Stelle Weiterbildung (further education information)
 Katholische Erwachsenenbildung (Catholic adult education)
 Kreisvolkshochschule (KVHS, district folk high school)
 Staatliche Lehr- und Versuchsanstalt (state teaching and experimental station)
 Volkshochschule der Verbandsgemeinde Montabaur (VHS, folk high school of the Verbandsgemeinde of Montabaur)
 Institut für Schulung und Beruf (ISB, institute for schooling and careers)

Town partnerships 
Montabaur maintains partnership arrangements with the following towns:
 Tonnerre, Burgundy, France
 Brackley, Northamptonshire, England, United Kingdom
 Sebnitz, Saxony, Germany

Furthermore, the Verbandsgemeinde of Montabaur has a partnership with an American town:
 Fredericksburg, Texas, USA

Notable residents

Sons and daughters of the town 
 J. C. Leyendecker (1874–1951), graphic artist and illustrator
 Maximilian Sauerborn (1889–1963), jurist, administrative official and politician
 Anton Diel (1898–1959), politician, 1949–59 Member of the Bundestag
 August Kunst (1898–1980), politician, 1957–61 Member of the Bundestag
 Heinz König (1927–2002), economist, Rector of the University of Mannheim, founding father of the Centre for European Economic Research (ZEW) in Mannheim
 Frank Decker (1964–), political scientist, professor of political science at the University of Bonn

People connected with Montabaur 
 Johann V of Isenburg (1507–1556), Archbishop and Elector of Trier, lived his last years at Schloss Montabaur where he died
 Ralph Dommermuth (1963–), founder of United Internet and Internet entrepreneur from Germany
 Joseph Kehrein (1808–1876), honorary citizen of Montabaur, teacher, philologist, historian and director of the Montabaur teachers’ college
 Karl Walter (1862–1929), organist, educator, scientist and authority on organs and bells, died in Montabaur and is buried here
Andreas Lubitz the co-pilot of Germanwings 9525

References

External links 

  
 

Westerwaldkreis